Nanotechnology education involves a multidisciplinary natural science education with courses such as physics, chemistry, mathematics and molecular biology. It is being offered by many universities around the world. The first program involving nanotechnology was offered by the University of Toronto's Engineering Science program, where nanotechnology could be taken as an option.

Here is a partial list of universities offering nanotechnology education, and the degrees offered (Bachelor of Science, Master of Science, and/or Ph.D in Nanotechnology).

Africa

Egypt
 Nile University - master's
 The American University in Cairo - master's
 Zewail City of Science and Technology - B.Sc
Cairo University - Faculty of Engineering - Masters of Science

Asia

Hong Kong 
Hong Kong University of Science and Technology - MPhil, PhD

India 
VIT University, Vellore, Center for Nanotechnology Research, M.Tech. in Nanotechnology
 Srinivas Institute of Technology, Mangaluru, Karnataka [Affiliated to VTU, Belagavi, Approved by AICTE] - B.E. Nano Technology
Desh Bhagat School of Engineering, Mandi Gobindgarh, Punjab Desh Bhagat University - B.Tech & M.Tech with Nanotechnology
Tezpur Central University, Napam, Tezpur (M.Sc & Ph.D in nanoscience and technology)
Indian Institute of Science, Bangalore
IITs - B.Tech & M.Tech with Nanotechnology
Delhi Technological University (formerly DCE), Delhi - M.Tech
NITs
Central University of Jharkhand - Integrated M.Tech Nanotechnology
 Jamia Millia Islamia (a central university by an act of parliament), New Delhi - M.Tech (Nanotechnology) & Ph.D
 Sikkim Manipal Institute of Technology - M.Tech (Material Science and Nanotechnology, 2-year regular programme), Ph.D, Equipments: AFM, STM, HWCVD, TCVD
Amity University, Noida, Uttar Pradesh B.Tech, M.Sc, M.Sc + M.Tech, M.Tech
Jawaharlal Nehru Technological University, Kukatpally, Hyderabad, Telangana - M.Sc (Nanoscience & Technology) M.Tech (Nanotechnology) & Ph.D (Nano Science & Technology)
Sam Higginbottom Institute of Agriculture, Technology and Sciences - Postgraduate diploma in nanotechnology.
 Jawaharlal Nehru Technological University College of Engineering Sultanpur, B.Tech in (Mechanical and NanoTechnology) Engineering.
University of Madras, National Centre for Nanoscience and Nanotechnology, Chennai - M.Tech, M.Sc and PhD in Nanoscience and Nanotechnology
University of Petroleum and Energy Studies, DEHRADUN-Uttarakhand, B.Tech - Material Science specialization in Nanotechnology
Nanobeach, Delhi - Advanced Nanotechnology Programs
SASTRA University, Thanjavur Tamil Nadu -M.Tech integrated in medical nanotechnology
Nano Science and Technology Consortium, Delhi - Nanotechnology Programs
Vels university, Chennai - M.Sc nanoscience
Bhagwant University, ajmer Rajasthan - B.Tech - Nanotechnology engineering
Maharaja Sayajirao University of Baroda, M.Sc Materials Science (Nanotechnology)
National Institute of Technology Calicut - M.Tech and Ph.D
SRM Institute of Science and Technology, Kattankulathur - B.Tech, M.S. (coursework, research), M.Tech and Ph.D
Noorul Islam College of Engineering, Kumarakovil - M.Tech Nanotechnology
Karunya University, Coimbatore - master's and Ph.D
Anna University Chennai
Andhra University, Visakhapatnam - M.Sc., M.Tech
Sri Venkateswara University, Tirupathi - M.Sc, M.Tech
Bharathiar University, Coimbatore - M.Sc Nanoscience and Technology (Based on Physics or Chemistry or Biotechnology), M.Phil and Ph.D
Osmania University, Hyderabad - M.Sc., M.Tech
Anna University Tiruchirappalli, Tamil Nadu - M.Tech (Nanoscience and Technology)
Centre For Converging Technologies, University of Rajasthan, Jaipur - M.Tech (Nanotechnology And Nanomaterials)
KSR College of Technology, Tiruchengode - M.Tech NanoScience and Technology
Mepco-Schlenk Engineering College, Sivakasi - M.Tech Nanoscience and Technology
Sarah Tucker college for Women (Affiliated with MS University, Tirunelveli) B.Sc Nanoscience
Karunya University, Coimbatore-114 - Integrated M.Sc Nanoscience & Nanotechnology and M.Tech with Nanotechnology
Acharya Nagarjuna University, Guntur - Integrated M.Sc Nanotechnology
Indian Institute of Nano Science & TechnologyBangalore
Sri Guru Granth Sahib World University Fatehgarh Sahib, Punjab
Anna University, Coimbatore
 Mount Carmel College, Autonomous, Bangalore - M.Sc in Nanoscience and Technology (2-year course)
Important:
AICTE New Delhi has added B.Tech & M.Tech Nanotechnology courses in the list of approved courses in the academic year 2011 – 2012
North Maharashtra University JALGAON M.Tech in Nanoscience and Nanotechnology
Department of Environmental Microbiology, Babasaheb Bhimrao Ambedkar Central University, Lucknow. M.Sc in Nanoscience and Nanotechnology,
Amity Institute of Nanotechnology, Amity University, Noida [bachelor's and master's in Nanotechnology]
School of Nanoscience and Technology, Shivaji University, Kolhapur-416004, Maharashtra State, India (B.Sc-M.Sc 5-year integrated Course)
Department of Nanotechnology offers two year M.Sc. course in Nanotechnology, Dr. Babasaheb Ambedkar Marathwada University, Aurangabad-431004, Maharashtra State, India.

Iran
Iran university of science & technology - master's
Sharif University of Technology - master's, Ph.D
Tarbiat Modares University - master's, Ph.D
University of Tehran - master's, Ph.D
Amirkabir University of Technology - master's
University of Isfahan - master's
Shiraz University  - master's
University of Sistan and Baluchestan - master's
University of Kurdistan - master's
Islamic Azad University of Marvdasht  - master's

Israel
Bar Ilan University Institute of Nanotechnology & Advanced Materials (BINA)- with research centers for materials, medicine, energy, magnetism, cleantech and photonics. M.Sc, Ph.D, youth programs.
The Hebrew University of Jerusalem Center for Nanoscience and Nanotechnology - with units for nanocharecerization and nanofabrication. M.Sc, Ph.D
Technion Russell Berrie Nanotechnology Institute (RBNI)- Over 110 faculty members from 14 departments. M.Sc, Ph.D
Tel Aviv University Center for Nanoscience and Nanotechnology Interdisciplinary graduate program, marked by a large participation of students from the industry. M.Sc
The Weizmann Institute of Science - has a research group in the Department of Science Teaching that build programs for introduction high school teachers and students to Nanotechnology.

Japan 
Tohoku University - bachelor's, master's, Ph.D
Nagoya University - bachelor's, master's, Ph.D
Kyushu University - master's, Ph.D
Keio University - master's
University of Tokyo - master's, Ph.D
Tokyo Institute of Technology - master's, Ph.D
Kyoto University - master's, Ph.D
Waseda University - Ph.D
Osaka University - master's, Ph.D
University of Tsukuba -master's, Ph.D
University of Electro-Communications - master's, Ph.D on Micro-Electronic

Malaysia 
University Putra Malaysia - M.Sc and Ph.D programs in Nanomaterials and Nanotechnology UPM-Nano
Malaysia Multimedia University - bachelor's degree in electronic engineering majoring in Nanotechnology (Nano-Engineering)
Malaysia University of Science & Technology - B.Sc in Nanoscience & Nanoengineering with Business Management

Pakistan 
University of the Punjab, Lahore, Centre of Excellence in Solid State Physics, M.S./Ph.D Program in Nanotechnology
Preston Institute Of Nanoscience And Technology (PINSAT), Islamabad, B.S. Nanoscience and Technology
University of Engineering & Technology, Lahore, Introductory Short Courses
Quaid-e-Azam University, Islamabad, master's degree research projects
Pakistan Institute of Engineering and Applied Sciences (PIEAS), Islamabad, National Centre for Nanotechnology
COMSATS Institute of Information Technology (CIIT), Islamabad, Center for Micro and Nano Devices
National University of Science & Technology (NUST), Islamabad, M.S. and Ph.D Nanoscience & Engineering
National Institute of Bio Genetic Engineering (NIGBE), Faisalabad, Research Projects
Ghulam Ishaq Khan Institute of Engineering & Technology (GIKI), TOPI, KPK, master's/Ph.D degree program
Baha-ud-din Zakaria University, Multan
Government College University (GCU), Lahore
University of Sind, Karachi
Peshawar University, Peshawar
International Islamic University Islamabad Bachelor & Master of Science in Nanotechnology

Singapore
National University of Singapore - B.Eng in Engineering Science with Nanoscience & Nanotechnology options, master's and PhD in Nanoscience and Nanotechnology Specialization

Sri Lanka 
Sri Lanka Institute of Nanotechnology (SLINTEC) - Ph.D & M.Phil

Thailand 
Chulalongkorn University - bachelor's degree in engineering (Nano-Engineering)
Mahidol University - Center of Nanoscience and Nanotechnology - Master Program
Kasetsart University - Center of Nanotechnology, Kasetsart University Research and Development Institute
Center of Excellence in Nanotechnology at AIT - Center of Excellence in Nanotechnology - master's and Ph.D programs
College of Nanotechnology at KMITL - bachelor's degree in engineering (Nanomaterials), M.Sc and Ph.D programa in Nanoscience and Nanotechnology

Turkey 
UNAM-Ulusal Nanoteknoloji Araştırma Merkezi, Bilkent University - master's, Ph.D (Materials Science and Nanotechnology)
Hacettepe University - master's, Ph.D (Nanotechnology and Nanomedicine)
TOBB University of Economics and Technology - B.S. Materials Science and Nanotechnology Engineering, master's, Ph.D
Istanbul Technical University - master's, Ph.D (Nanoscience and Nanoengineering)
Middle East Technical University - master's, Ph.D
Anadolu University - master's
Atatürk University - master's, Ph.D (Nanoscience and Nanoengineering)

Europe 
A list of the master's programs is kept by the UK-based Institute of Nanotechnology in their Nano, Enabling, and Advanced Technologies (NEAT) Post-graduate Course Directory.

Joint Programmes
Chalmers.se, Frontiers Joint Curriculum - masters's
EMM-NANO.org, Erasmus Mundus Master Nanoscience and Nanotechnology - master's
Master-Nanotech.com, International Master in Nanotechnology - international master's

Belgium
Katholieke Universiteit Leuven - master's in Nanotechnology and Nanoscience
University of Antwerp - M.Sc in Nanophysics

Czech Republic
Technical University of Liberec - bachelor's, master's, Ph.D
Palacký University, Olomouc - bachelor's, master's
Technical University of Ostrava - bachelor's, master's
Technical University of Brno - bachelor's, master's
Cyprus 
Near east university - bacherlor's

Denmark
University of Aalborg - bachelor's, master's, Ph.D
University of Aarhus - bachelor's, master's, Ph.D
University of Copenhagen - bachelor's, master's, Ph.D
Technical University of Denmark - bachelor's, master's, Ph.D
University of Southern Denmark - bachelor's, master's, Ph.D

France
Université Lille Nord de France & École Centrale de Lille, CARNOT Institut d'électronique de microélectronique et de nanotechnologie (Lille) - master's in microelectronics, nanotechnologies and telecom, doctorate (Ph.D in microelectronics, nanotechnologies, acoustics and telecommunications)
 University of Grenoble & Grenoble Institute of Technology, CARNOT CEA-Leti: Laboratoire d'électronique des technologies de l'information (LETI) • Minatec (Grenoble) - master's, doctorate
 University of Bordeaux, CARNOT Materials and systems Institute of Bordeaux (MIB) (Bordeaux) - master's, doctorate
 Université de Bourgogne, CARNOT Institut FEMTO-ST (Besançon) - Nanotechnologies et Nanobiosciences - master's, doctorate
 École Nationale Supérieure des Mines de Saint-Étienne, Centre de micro-électronique de Provence (Gardanne) - master's, doctorate
 Paris-Sud 11 University, Institut d'électronique fondamentale (Orsay) - master's, doctorate
 Paris-Pierre and Marie Curie University, Institut des nano-sciences (Paris) - master's, doctorate
 University of Toulouse, Institut de nano-technologies (Toulouse) - master's, doctorate
University of Technology of Troyes - Nanotechnology (and Optics) - master's, doctorate
University of Lyon & École Centrale de Lyon, Université Claude Bernard Lyon 1 a two-year nanotechnology M.Sc program

Germany
Kaiserslautern University of Technology - master's, certificate short term courses (Distance Learning)
 Bielefeld University - master's
Karlsruhe Institute of Technology, graduate degrees
University of Duisburg-Essen - bachelor's, master's
University of Erlangen–Nuremberg - bachelor's, master's
University of Hamburg - bachelor's, master's
University of Hannover - bachelor's
University of Kassel - bachelor's
Ludwig-Maximilians-Universität München - Ph.D 
Munich University of Applied Sciences - master's
Saarland University - bachelor's
University of Ulm - master's
University of Würzburg - bachelor's

Greece
National Technical University of Athens - master's in Micro-systems and Nano-devices

Ireland 
Trinity College, Dublin - bachelor's
Dublin Institute of Technology - bachelor's

Italy 
IUSS Pavia - master's
Mediterranea University of Reggio Calabria - master's
Perugia University - master's
Polytechnic University of Turin - master's 
Polytechnic University of Milan - bachelor's, master's
Sapienza University of Rome - master's
University of Padua - master's
University of Salento - master's 
University of Trieste - Ph.D
University of Venice - bachelor's, master's 
University of Verona - master's

Netherlands
Radboud University Nijmegen - master's, Ph.D
Leiden University - master's
Delft University of Technology - master's, Ph.D
University of Groningen - master's, Ph.D, including the Top Master Program in Nanoscience 
University of Twente - master's

Norway
Vestfold University College - bachelor's, master's, Ph.D
Norwegian University of Science and Technology - master's
University of Bergen - bachelor's and master's
University of Oslo - bachelor's and master's

Poland
Gdańsk University of Technology - bachelor's, master's
Jagiellonian University - bachelor's, master's, Ph.D
University of Warsaw - bachelor's and master's in Nanostructure Engineering (http://nano.fuw.edu.pl/ - only in Polish)

Russia
Mendeleev Russian University of Chemistry and Technology - bachelor's
Moscow State University - bachelor's, master's
Moscow Institute of Physics and Technology (MIPT)
National Research University of Electronic Technology (MIET) - bachelor's, master's
Peoples' Friendship University of Russia (PFUR) - master's in engineering & technology: "Nanotechnology and Microsystem Technology"
National University of Science and Technology MISIS - bachelor's, master's
Samara State Aerospace University - bachelor's, master's
Tomsk State University of Control Systems and Radioelectronics (TUSUR)
Ural Federal University (UrFU) - bachelor's (master's) of Engineering & Technology: "Nanotechnology and Microsystem Technology", "Electronics and Nanoelectronics" (profiles: "Physical Electronics", "Functional Materials of micro-, opto-and nanoelectronics")

Spain
DFA.ua.es, Master en Nanociencia y Nanotecnologia Molecular - master's
Universitat Autònoma de Barcelona, bachelor's in nanoscience and nanotechnology
Universitat Autònoma de Barcelona, master's in nanotechnology
Rovira i Virgili at Tarragona, master's in nanoscience and nanotechnology

Sweden
KTH Royal Institute of Technology - master's
Linköping University - master's
Lund University - bachelor's, master's
Chalmers University of Technology - bachelor's, master's

Switzerland
Eidgenössische Technische Hochschule Zürich, Zurich - master's, Ph.D
University of Basel - bachelor's, master's, Ph.D

United Kingdom
Bangor University - master's
University of Birmingham - Ph.D
University of Cambridge - master's, Ph.D
Cranfield University - master's, Ph.D (Certificate/Degree Programs)
Heriot-Watt University - bachelor's, master's
Lancaster University - master's
Imperial College London - master's
University College London - master's
University of Leeds - bachelor's, master's
University of Liverpool - master's
University of Manchester- Ph.D
University of Nottingham - master's
University of Oxford - Postgraduate Certificate
University of Sheffield - master's, Ph.D
University of Surrey - master's
University of Sussex - bachelor's
University of Swansea- B.Eng, M.Eng, M.Sc, M.Res, M.Phil and Ph.D
University of Ulster - master's
University of York- bachelor's, master's

North America

Canada 
University of Alberta - B.Sc in Engineering Physics with Nanoengineering option
University of Toronto - B.A.Sc in Engineering Science with Nanoengineering option
University of Waterloo - B.A.Sc in Nanotechnology Engineering
 Waterloo Institute for Nanotechnology -B.Sc, B.A.Sc, master's, Ph.D, Post Doctorate
McMaster University - B.Sc in Engineering Physics with Nanotechnology option
University of British Columbia - B.A.Sc in Electrical Engineering with Nanotechnology & Microsystems option
Carleton University - B.Sc in Chemistry with Concentration in Nanotechnology
University of Calgary - B.Sc Minor in Nanoscience, B.Sc Concentration in Nanoscience
University of Guelph - B.Sc in Nanoscience
Northern Alberta Institute of Technology - Technical Diploma in Nanotechnology Systems

México 
 Universidad tecnológica gral. Mariano Escobedo (UTE) - bachelor's in Nanotechnology
 Instituto Nacional de Astrofisica, Optica y Electronica (INAOE) - M.Sc and Ph.D
 Centro de Investigación en Materiales Avanzados (CIMAV) - M.Sc and PhD in Nanotechnology
 Instituto Potosino de Investigación Científica y Tecnológica (IPICyT) - M.Sc and PhD in Nanotechnology
 Centro de Investigación en Química Aplicada (CIQA) - M.Sc and PhD in Nanotechnology
 Centro de Investigación y de Estudios Avanzados (CINVESTAV) - Ph.D in Nanoscience and Nanotechnology
 Universidad Politécnica del Valle de México (UPVM) - bachelor's in Nanotechnology Engineering
 Universidad de las Américas Puebla (UDLAP)- bachelor's (Nanotechnology and Molecular Engineering). This undergraduate program was the first one at Mexico and Latin America, specializing professionals in the field; it started in August 2006. An account on its historical development has recently been published.
 Instituto Tecnológico y de Estudios Superiores de Occidente (ITESO)- bachelor's
 Instituto Tecnológico Superior de Poza Rica (ITSPR)- bachelor's
 Universidad de La Ciénega de Michoacán de Ocampo (UCMO)- bachelor's in Nanotechnology Engineering
 Instituto Tecnologico de Tijuana (ITT) - bachelor's (Nanotechnology Engineering)
 Universidad Autónoma de Querétaro (UAQ) - bachelor's in Nanotechnology Engineering
 Universidad Autónoma de Baja California (UABC) - bachelor's in Nanotechnology Engineering
 Universidad Veracruzana (UV) - Master of Science in Micro and Nanosystems
 Instituto Mexicano del Petróleo (IMP) - M.Sc & Ph.D in Materials and Nanostructures
 Universidad Nacional Autónoma de México (UNAM) at Mexico City, University City (UNAM) - M.Sc & Ph.D in Materials approach to nanoscience and nanotechnology
 Universidad Nacional Autónoma de México (UNAM) at Ensenada, Baja California (UNAM) - Bachelor in Nanotechnology Engineering
 Another Universities and Institutes in Mexico

United States
Arizona State University - Professional Science master's (PSM) in Nanoscience
Boston University - Concentration in Nanotechnology, Minor in Nanotechnology Engineering. 
Chippewa Valley Technical College - associate degree
Cinano.com, International Association of Nano and California Institute of Nano, (CNCP) Certified Nano and Clean technology Professional-Nanotechnology Experience for Engineers
College of Nanoscale Science and Engineering - B.S., M.S., Ph.D in Nanoscale Science, Nanoscale Engineering
Dakota County Technical College - associate degree
Danville Community College - A.A.S. in Nanotechnology
Forsyth Technical Community College - Associate of Science
George Mason University (Virginia) - Graduate certificate
Hudson Valley Community College - associate degree, Electrical Technology: Semiconductor Manufacturing Technology
Ivy Tech Community College of Indiana - Associate of Science in Nanotechnology. 
Johns Hopkins University - M.S. in Materials Science and Engineering with Nanotechnology Option
Louisiana Tech University - B.S. Nanosystems Engineering, M.S. Molecular Sciences & Nanotechnology, Ph.D (Micro/Nanotechnology and Micro/Nanoelectronics Emphasis)
North Dakota State College of Science - associate degree
Northern Illinois University - Certificate in Nanotechnology
Oklahoma State University–Okmulgee Institute of Technology - Associate of Technology
Penn State University - Minor in Nanotechnology, M.S. Nanotechnology
Portland State University - undergraduate/graduate course in support of a Ph.D program in Applied Physics
Radiological Technologies University - M.S. in Nanomedicine and dual MS in Nanomedicine and Medical Physics
Rice University - Public Outreach, K to 12 Summer Programs, Undergraduate and Graduate Programs/Degrees, Integrated Physics & Chemistry - Nanotechnology Experience for Teachers Program, Research Experience for Undergraduates Program
Richland College - associate degree
Rochester Institute of Technology, B.S., M.S. Microelectronic Engineering, Ph.D Microsystems Engineering
Stevens Institute of Technology - Five departments in engineering and science offer Master of Science, Master of Engineering, and Doctor of Philosophy degrees with Nanotechnology concentration
University at Albany, The State University of New York - B.S. Nanoscale Science, B.S. Nanoscale Engineering, master's and Ph.D
University of Arkansas, Fayetteville - M.S./Ph.D Several departments in Science and Engineering have excellent research in Nanotechnology
University of California, San Diego - B.S. Nanoengineering, M.S. Nanoengineering
University of California, San Diego - B.S. NanoEngineering, M.S. NanoEngineering, Ph.D NanoEngineering
University of Central Florida - B.S. Nanoscience and Nanotechnology track in Liberal Studies
University of Central Florida, Orlando, FL - B.S. in Nanoscience and Nanotechnology track in Liberal Studies
University of Maryland, College Park - Minor in Nanoscale Science and Technology NanoCenter.umd.edu
University of Nevada, Reno - Minor in Nanotechnology 
University of North Carolina at Charlotte - Ph.D
University of North Carolina at Greensboro and NC A&T State University Joint School of Nanoscience & Nanoengineering - M.S. and PhD in Nanoscience and Nanoengineering
University of Oklahoma Bachelor of Science in Engineering Physics - Nanotechnology
University of Pennsylvania- Master of Science in Engineering (M.S.E.), Undergraduate Minor , Graduate Certificate  in Nanotechnology.
University of Pittsburgh - Bachelor in Engineering Science - Nanoengineering 
University of Tulsa - B.S. with a specialization in nanotechnology
University of Utah - Nanomedicine and Nanobiosensors. [nano.Utah.edu]
University of Washington- Nanoscience and Molecular Engineering option under Materials Science and Engineering, Ph.D in Nanotechnology
University of Wisconsin - Platteville - Minor in Microsystems & Nanotechnology
University of Wisconsin - Stout - B.S. in Nanotechnology and Nanoscience
Virginia Commonwealth University - Ph.D in Nanoscience and Nanotechnology
Virginia Tech B.S. in Nanoscience
Wayne State University - Nanoengineering Certificate Program

Oceania

Australia

New South Wales
University of New South Wales - bachelor's, Ph.D
University of Sydney - Bachelor of Science majoring in Nanoscience and Technology
University of Technology, Sydney - bachelor's
University of Western Sydney - bachelor's
University of Wollongong - bachelor's

Queensland
University of Queensland - bachelor's

South Australia
Flinders University - bachelor's, master's

Victoria
La Trobe University, Melbourne - Ph.D, master's in Nanotechnology (Graduate Entry), master's/bachelor's (double degree), bachelor's (double degree) website
RMIT University - bachelor's
The University of Melbourne - master's
St Helena Secondary College Melbourne - High School education

Western Australia
Curtin University - bachelor's
University of Western Australia - bachelor's
Murdoch University - bachelor's

New Zealand
Massey University, New Zealand - Bachelor of Science (Nanoscience)
Massey University, New Zealand - Bachelor of Engineering (Nanotechnology)

South America

Brazil
 Universidade Federal do Rio Grande do Sul, UFRGS - bachelor's
 Federal University of Rio de Janeiro - bachelor's, master's, Ph.D
 Universidade Federal do ABC - master's, Ph.D
 Centro Universitário Franciscano - UNIFRA - master's
 Pontifícia Universidade Católica do Rio de Janeiro - bachelor's, master's, Ph.D

Nanotechnology in schools
In recent years, there has been a growing interest in introducing nanoscience and nanotechnology in grade schools, especially at the high school level. In the United States, although very few high schools officially offer a two-semester course in nanotechnology, “nano” concepts are bootstrapped and taught during traditional science classes using a number of educational resources and hands-on activities developed by dedicated non-profit organizations, such as:
 The National Science Teacher Association, which has published a number of textbooks for nanotechnology in K-12 education, including a teacher's guide and an activity manual for hands-on experiences. 
 Nano-Link, a notable program of the Dakota County Technical College, which has developed a variety of nanotech-related hands-on activities supported by toolkits to teach concepts in nanotechnology throughout direct lab experience.
 Omni Nano, which is developing comprehensive educational resources specifically designed to support a two-semester high school course, both online and in classrooms. Omni Nano also discusses issues in nanotechnology education on its dedicated blog. 
 Nano4Me, which has a good amount of resources for K-12 education, although their program is intended for higher education. Their K-12 resources include introductory level modules and activities, interactive multimedia, and a collection of experiments and hands-on activities. 
 Nanoscale Informal Science Education Network (NISE), which has a website of educational products designed to engage the public in nano science, engineering, and technology. NISE also organizes Nano Days, a nationwide festival of educational programs about nanoscale science and engineering and its potential impact on the future.

In Egypt, in2nano is a high school outreach program aiming to increase scientific literacy and prepare students for the sweeping changes of nanotechnology.

Nanotechnology education outside of school
 Nanoscale Informal Science Education Network (NISE) has a website of educational products designed to engage the public in nano science, engineering, and technology. The NISE Network also organizes Nano Days, a nationwide festival of educational programs about nanoscale science and engineering and its potential impact on the future.

References

External links
 www.nisenet.org

Nanotechnology
Science education
Lists of universities and colleges